Juan Morera Altisent (7 January 1947 – 1 October 2006) was a Spanish handball player. He competed in the 1972 Summer Olympics.

In 1972 he was part of the Spanish team which finished fifteenth in the Olympic tournament. He played all five matches and scored 22 goals.

Notes

References

External links
 
 
 

1947 births
2006 deaths
Spanish male handball players
Olympic handball players of Spain
Handball players at the 1972 Summer Olympics